The , also known as Ryuga Cave or Ryugado Cave, is a limestone cave located in Kami City, Kōchi Prefecture, Japan. It is one of the three largest limestone caves in Japan,  with a total length of 4 kilometers. The cave has been designated as a National Natural monument of Japan.

Overview 
The Cave took roughly 175 million years to form.

Dozens of examples of Yayoi pottery, furnace remains, charcoal, and animal bones were discovered inside the cave, indicating that people were living in the cave during the Yayoi period approximately 2,000 years ago. For this reason, the cave was designated a National Historic Site in 1934.

The cave was opened to the public in August 1931; about a one kilometer portion is a show cave with illumination, stairways and marked paths.

Gallery

See also
List of historic sites of Japan (Kōchi)

References

External links

Shikoku Tourism home page

Natural monuments of Japan
Caves of Japan
Kami, Kōchi
Show caves in Japan
Landforms of Kōchi Prefecture
Tourist attractions in Kōchi Prefecture
Historic Sites of Japan
Yayoi period